William M. Butterfield (1860–1932) was an American architect from New Hampshire.

Early life and education
Butterfield was born October 22, 1860 in Sidney, Maine. His father, Chesmon Butterfield, was a carpenter and builder. The family moved to Waterville in 1871, when young Butterfield was 11 years old. At that time, his father established himself as an architect as well as a builder. He trained with his father and, at the age of 16, took a job with Foster & Dutton, a Waterville contracting firm with a statewide reputation. He moved quickly through the ranks, and by the age of 17 was supervising the construction of major structures, most notably the great 1879 expansion of the Hotel Wentworth in New Castle.

Career
In 1880, he established himself as a contractor in Concord, Massachusetts, but moved in 1881 to Manchester, New Hampshire, to open an architect's office.

Upon his arrival, he formed a partnership with Albert E. Bodwell, who would later become Edward Dow's head designer.  The partnership, Bodwell & Butterfield, had been dissolved by September. Butterfield remained in private practice for the duration of the 19th century. In about 1907 he took his son Clinton C. Butterfield and Parker K. Weston into the firm, which became the William M. Butterfield Company. By 1920, Butterfield was managing the practice alone. In 1924 Butterfield formed a partnership with architect Jean-Noël Guertin. The firm was known as the Butterfield-Guertin Company and lasted until 1927, after which Butterfield resumed his private practice until his death in 1932. During his final years, his chief associate was Norris W. Corey. Corey would be Butterfield's successor, and practiced until his retirement in the 1970s. Among Corey's designs is the Town Hall of Goffstown, New Hampshire, built in 1947.

Personal life
Butterfield was married twice. First in 1882 to Rose E. Annis of Peterborough. She died in 1884, not long after giving birth to their son, Clinton Chesmon Butterfield. He married again in 1885, to Belle Knox of Manchester.

Butterfield died June 6, 1932 in Manchester.

Legacy
Butterfield was the leading architect in Manchester and New Hampshire from about the 1890s until the time of World War I. During that period he was highly sought after as a designer of town halls, courthouses, churches, and other public and private buildings.

During the 1880s Butterfield employed John F. Stanton, who would go on to be a noted architect in Topeka, Kansas.

At least nine of his designs have been placed on the United States National Register of Historic Places, and many others contribute to listed historic districts.

Architectural works

References

1862 births
1932 deaths
Architects from New Hampshire
19th-century American architects
20th-century American architects
People from Kennebec County, Maine
People from Manchester, New Hampshire
People from Waterville, Maine